The 2017 Dutch Artistic Gymnastics Championships were held in Rotterdam from 17-18 June.

Medalists

References 

2015
2015 in European sport
2015 in gymnastics
International gymnastics competitions hosted by the Netherlands